Conall Francis Murtagh (born 29 June 1985) is a Northern Irish sports scientist and professional football coach who is currently the first-team fitness coach for Premier League team Liverpool. A former footballer, he made over seventy appearances in the Scottish League, Football League and Football Conference, as well as making 226 appearances in the Welsh Premier League, primarily for Bala Town. He has played in European competitions for five seasons, representing Bala Town in Europe in three seasons 2012–13, 2014–15 and 2015–16, Rhyl in 2010 and the Champions League with TNS.

He also represented Northern Ireland at all age groups to under-21 level and captained the side.

Football career

Murtagh started his senior career with Ballymena United and Crusaders before joining Scottish League club Hearts on a two-year contract in 2003. He made no appearances for Hearts and joined Raith Rovers on loan in January 2005, where he made eleven first-team appearances in the remainder of the 2004–05 season in the Scottish First Division.

Murtagh was released by Hearts at the end of the 2004–05 (injury hit) season, commenced a degree at University of Manchester and joined League of Wales club Connah's Quay Nomads, where he made 27 league appearances, scoring three goals, in the 2005–06 season. He joined Rhyl in 2006, making 25 Welsh Premier league appearances, scoring once, in the 2006–07 season and collected a Welsh League Cup runners-up medal after a penalty defeat to Caersws in March 2007.

Murtagh joined Conference North club Southport in May 2007 but quickly left to join League Two side Wrexham in June 2007. He made six league and cup appearances for Wrexham in the 2007–08 season while completing his final year at University of Manchester, and a further six appearances for Football Conference side Droylsden, who he joined on a two-month loan in January 2008.

In January 2009, Murtagh signed for Welsh Premier League side The New Saints and in January 2010, he joined Aberystwyth Town on loan for the remainder of the 2009–10 season, scoring three times in thirteen appearances before being recalled in April. At the end of the season, Murtagh's contract ended at The New Saints and he joined Aberystwyth Town on a permanent basis.

In July 2011, he moved to Bala Town and helped the side achieve 5th place in the 2011–12 season playing a record number of games and making a clean sweep of end of season awards. In 2012–13, Bala were play-off champions and qualified for the first time in the club's history for a European position in the 2013–14 campaign.  Bala qualified again for the Europa Cup in the ensuing seasons, 2014–15, 2015–16, 2016–17. Murtagh has been club captain of Bala Town since 2014.

He has represented his country, Northern Ireland, 38 times at international level at all underage groups under-15, under-16, under-17, under-19 and is also an under-21 International.  He captained the side a number of times.

Sports scientist and fitness coach
Dr. Murtagh holds a degree in Physiology from the University of Manchester and has a master of science in sports science with physiology from the University of Chester. He completed his PhD in sports science at Liverpool John Moores University in March 2017.

He is currently first team sports science fitness coach for the Liverpool and was previously Fitness Coach at the Liverpool FC Academy Under 18 Squad which progressed to the quarter final of youth Champions League (2014/15).

Conall also has a strong commitment to academic research within theoretical and applied sports science and is a prolific contributor of high quality, ground-breaking publications in the field.

Honours
 Welsh Premier League Team of the Year: 2006–07

Academic Publications and Conferences 

Murtagh CF, Brownlee TE, Rienzi E, Roquero S, Moreno S, Huertas G, Robert M. Erskine et al. (June 2020) 
The genetic profile of elite youth soccer players and its association with power and speed depends on maturity status.  PLOS One 15(6): e0234458. https://doi.org/10.1371/journal.pone.0234458

Murtagh Conall; Naughton, Robert; McRobert, Allistair; O’Boyle, Andrew; Morgans, Ryland; Drust, Barry; Erskine, Robert (March 2019)
A Coding System to Quantify Powerful Actions in Soccer Match Play: A Pilot Study, Research Quarterly for Exercise and Sport, 2019/03/15, 10.1080/02701367.2019.1576838

Murtagh, Conall; Stubbs, Michael; Vanrenterghem, Jos; O’Boyle, Andrew; Morgans, Ryland; Drust, Barry; Erskine, Robert (June 2018)
Patellar tendon properties distinguish elite from non-elite soccer players and are related to peak horizontal but not vertical power. European Journal of Applied Physiology. 118. 10.1007/s00421-018-3905-0.

Murtagh, Conall; Brownlee, Thomas; O’Boyle, Andrew; Morgans, Ryland; Drust, Barry; Erskine, Robert. (February 2018) 
Importance of Speed and Power in Elite Youth Soccer Depends on Maturation Status. Journal of Strength and Conditioning Research. 32. 297–303. 10.1519/JSC.0000000000002367.

Murtagh, Conall; Nulty, Christopher; Vanrenterghem, Jos; O'Boyle, Andy; Morgans, Ryland; Drust, Barry; Erskine, Robert. (December 2017)
The Neuromuscular Determinants of Unilateral Jump Performance in Soccer Players Are Direction-Specific. International Journal of Sports Physiology and Performance. 13. 10.1123/ijspp.2017–0589.

Conall F. Murtagh, Andrew O'Boyle, Ryland Morgans, Barry Drust, Robert M.Erskine – Unilateral jumps in different directions: a novel assessment of soccer-associated power? Journal of Science and Medicine in Sport Volume 20, Issue 11, November 2017, Pages 1018–1023

Murtagh Conall F, Vanrenterghem Jos, O'Boyle Andrew, Morgans Ryland, Drust Barry, Erskine Robert M.  Unilateral jumps in different directions: a novel assessment of soccer-associated power?. Journal of Science and Medicine in Sport https://dx.doi.org/10.1016/j.jsams.2017.03.016

Murtagh, C.F., O'Boyle, A., Morgans, R., Drust, B., Erskine, R.M. (2015, October). The Physiological Determinants and Genetic Contribution to Maximal Muscular Power in Elite Youth Soccer.  Oral presentation at Las Palmeiras Congress of Sports Science, São Paulo, Brazil.

Hall, Elliott; Larruskain, Jon; Gil, Susana; Lekue, Jose; Baumert, Philipp; Rienzi, Edgardo; Moreno, Sacha; Tannure, Marcio; Murtagh, Conall; Ade, Jack; Squires, Paul; Orme, Patrick; Anderson, Liam; Whitworth-Turner, Craig; Morton, James; Drust, Barry; Williams, Alun; Erskine, Robert. (April 2020). 
An injury audit in high-level male youth soccer players from English, Spanish, Uruguayan and Brazilian academies. Physical Therapy in Sport. 44. 10.1016/j.ptsp.2020.04.033.

Tang, Remy; Murtagh, Conall; Warrington, Giles; Cable, Tim; Morgan, Oliver; O’Boyle, Andrew; Burgess, Darren; Morgans, Ryland; Drust, Barry. (April 2018)
Directional Change Mediates the Physiological Response to High-Intensity Shuttle Running in Professional Soccer Players. Sports. 6. 39. 10.3390/sports6020039.

Brownlee, Thomas; Murtagh, Conall; Naughton, Robert; Whitworth-Turner, Craig; O’Boyle, Andy; Morgans, Ryland; Morton, James; Erskine, Robert; Drust, Barry. (February 2018)
Isometric maximal voluntary force evaluated using an isometric mid-thigh pull differentiates English Premier League youth soccer players from a maturity-matched control group. Science and Medicine in Football. 10.1080/24733938.2018.1432886.

Malone, J. J., Murtagh, C. F., Morgans, R., Burgess, D. J., Morton, J. P., & Drust, B. (September 2014). 
Countermovement Jump Performance Is Not Affected During an In-Season Training Microcycle in Elite Youth Soccer Players. The Journal of Strength & Conditioning Research, 29(3), 752–757.

Murtagh, C.F., Nulty, C, Stubbs, M, Vanrenterghem, J., O'Boyle, A., Morgans, R., Drust, B., Erskine, R.M. (2015, June). The Contribution of Skeletal Muscle Size, Architecture, Activation and Tendon Properties To Soccer-Specific Power. Oral presentation at 20th Annual Congress of the European College of Sport Science (ECSS) Malmo, Sweden.

References

External links
 Profile at the Liverpool F.C. website

 Conall Murtagh's Welsh Premier stats

1985 births
Living people
Association footballers from Belfast
Association footballers from Northern Ireland
Association football midfielders
Scottish Football League players
Cymru Premier players
English Football League players
Crusaders F.C. players
Heart of Midlothian F.C. players
Raith Rovers F.C. players
Connah's Quay Nomads F.C. players
Rhyl F.C. players
Southport F.C. players
Wrexham A.F.C. players
Droylsden F.C. players
The New Saints F.C. players
Aberystwyth Town F.C. players
Alumni of the University of Manchester
Bala Town F.C. players
People associated with Liverpool John Moores University
Alumni of the University of Chester
Liverpool F.C. non-playing staff
Northern Ireland youth international footballers
Northern Ireland under-21 international footballers
Association football coaches